Endophilin-A3 is a protein that in humans is encoded by the SH3GL3 gene.

Interactions 

SH3GL3 has been shown to interact with Huntingtin and SH3KBP1.

References

Further reading